Old Walls is a 1973 Soviet drama film directed by Viktor Tregubovich.

Plot 
The film tells about a woman who works as a director of a weaving factory near Moscow and meets a man who she is trying to escape from love for.

Cast 
 Lyudmila Gurchenko as Anna Smirnova
 Armen Dzhigarkhanyan as Volodya
 Yevgeniya Sabelnikova as Irina
 Vera Kuznetsova as Babushka (as V. Kuznetsova)
 Yevgeniy Kindinov as Pavlik (as Ye. Kindinov)
 Fyodor Odinokov as Aleksandr Kolesov (as F. Odinokov)
 Boris Gusakov as Viktor Petrovich
 Valentina Ananina as Anna Nikitichna (as V. Ananyena)
 Boris Arakelov as Yermakov (as B. Arakelov)
 Alla Budnitskaya as Ninochka (as A. Budnitskaya)

References

External links 
 

1973 films
1970s Russian-language films
Soviet drama films
1973 drama films